Williamstown Racecourse is a demolished station on the former Altona railway line, now part of the Werribee railway line in Melbourne, Australia. It was located in the suburb of Altona, immediately south of the Kororoit Creek Road level crossing and north of Kororoit Creek.

History
The station was opened in 1885 as the terminus of a 1.1 km branch from the main Geelong line, serving the adjacent Williamstown Racecourse. In 1888, the line was extended to Altona Beach by a private land development company, branching from the station yard on its western side.

The station consisted of an island platform, signal box, two run-around roads, and a number of sidings. The line to the station was electrified in 1920 as part of the Melbourne suburban electrification scheme. Shortly after the start of World War II, the racecourse was taken over by the government for military purposes and did not reopen after the war, although the overhead equipment at the station remained until 1950. Today, the remains of a few stanchion bases can be seen beside the Altona line.

References

See also

Disused railway stations in Melbourne
Railway stations in Australia opened in 1885
Railway stations closed in 1950